Cosmopterix athesiae is a moth of the family Cosmopterigidae. It is known from Italy (South Tirol), Spain, Greece and Africa (Cameroon and Tanzania).

The wingspan is about 10 mm. The wings are metallic shining brown, yellow and white.

History of study and etymology
It was collected by Danish entomologist Wilhelm von Hedemann in 1898 but was not formally described until 2006. It is named for Etschland in southern Tirol (Athesis is the old Latin name for the region).

References

athesiae
Moths of Europe
Moths of Africa